Rewat is a small village near Degana, Nagaur district, Rajasthan in northern India, having 500-600 houses. 

One of India's most significant deposits of tungsten ore is at Rewat.

References

Villages in Nagaur district